The Służew Old Cemetery is a Roman Catholic cemetery in the area of Stary Służew in the Ursynów district of Warsaw, Poland.

The cemetery is located next to the presbytery of St Catherine's Church at 17 Fosa Street.

Notable burials

 Poles murdered by military counterintelligence at ul. Krzywicki in the years 1945–1947
 Zbigniew Anusz (1925–2011) – professor of the Medical University of Warsaw, epidemiologist
 Teresa Badzian (1929–1989) – director and screenwriter of animated films
 Wiesław Barej (1934–2000) – veterinarian, professor and dean of the Warsaw University of Life Sciences (SGGW)
  Andrzej Bednarek (1949–2003) – philanthropist, entomologist professor at Warsaw University of Life Sciences
 Jan Blinowski (1939–2002) – physicist, professor of the  UW
 Zygmunt Bogacz (1932–1981) – docent at the Warsaw University of Life Sciences
 Krystyna Bolesta–Kukułka (1941–2004) – professor, former dean of Faculty of Management of the University of Warsaw, wife of Józef Kukułka
 Kazimierz Bosek (1932–2006) – journalist, publicist
 Jan Bud–Gusaim (1932–2003) – economist, professor of the Warsaw University of Life Sciences
 Władysław Chrapusta (1896–1982) – journalist, participant in Polish–Bolshevik War
 Hanna Chwalińska–Sadowska (1936–2012) – prof. dr. hab. medical sciences, specialist in rheumatology
 Stanisław Chwaliński (1936–1994) – doc.  AM, promoter of preventive medicine
 Antoni Czarnecki (1906–1989) – parson of the parish of St. Catherine (1950–1985)
 Wacław Czarnecki (1902–1990) – journalist, writer and former prisoner of Majdanek and Buchenwald Nazi concentration camps 
 Paweł Czartoryski (1924–1999) – lawyer, historian, prof.
 Jerzy Dmochowski (1923–1994) – prof. Warsaw University of Technology
 Marian Dmochowski (1924–2010) – economist, ambassador, undersecretary of state, head of the Ministry of Foreign Trade
 Aleksander Ferenc (1945–2001) – orientalist, prof. UW
 Piotr Figiel (1940–2011) – composer
 Józef Filipowicz (1933–2006) – pilot
 Michał Filipowicz (1914–1978) – RAF aviator, son of Wanda Krahelska
 Zbigniew Filipowicz (1917–1944) – paricipant of the Warsaw Rising
 Marian Gadzalski (1934–1985) – visual artist, photographer
 Jan Gaj (1943–2011) – physicist, prof. Faculty of Physics, University of Warsaw
  Zdzisław Benedykt Gałecki (1946–2009) – visual artist
 Bohdan Grzymała–Siedlecki (1919–1999) – writer, journalist, tourist guide
 Anna Halcewicz (1947–1988) – actress
 Maria Horbowa (1916–2007) – author of a book about the Great Famine in the Ukrainian which she herself experienced
 Adam Iwiński (1958–2010) – film director, actor
  Józef Jaworski (1923–2012) – doctor of technical sciences, lecturer at Warsaw University of Technology
 Kazimierz Jeczeń (1940–2001) – director, journalist
 Marek Keller (1955–2012) – ornithologist, naturalist, lecturer at the Warsaw University of Life Sciences
 Tadeusz Kiciński (1929–1988) – meliorant, professor at the Warsaw University of Life Sciences
 Zenon Kierul (1929–1986) – professor at the Warsaw University of Life Sciences
 Andrzej Klawe (1938–1991) – prof. of the Warsaw University of Technology
 Józef Kochman (1903–1995) – phytopathologist, mycologist, professor at the Warsaw University of Life Sciences, member of Polish Academy of Sciences
 Janusz Kondratowicz (1940–2014) – poet, satirist, songwriter
 Jan Karol Kostrzewski (1915–2005) – epidemiologist, former minister of health and social welfare, former president of the Polish Academy of Sciences
 Krystyna Krahelska (1914–1944) – poet, girl scout
 Wanda Krahelska (1886–1968) – a socialist activist
 Wojciech Kubiak (1841–1899) – parson of the parish of St. Catherine (1875–1899), dean  the Higher Metropolitan Seminary in Warsaw
 Bogusław Kubicki (1933–1985) – geneticist, professor at the Warsaw University of Life Sciences
 Jan Kuczkowski (1773–1865) – for 55 years parson of the parish of St. Catherine
 Józef Kuczyński (1913–1977) – docent at the Warsaw University of Life Sciences
 Zenona Kudanowicz (1893–1988) – actress
 Józef Kukułka (1929–2004) – professor at the  UW, husband of Krystyna Bolesta–Kukułka
 Tomasz Leoniuk (1963–2002) – diplomat
 Grażyna Lipińska (1902–1995) – a soldier, participant of the in the Battle of Warsaw, the 3rd Silesian Rising and the Warsaw Rising
 Włodzimierz Ławniczak (1959–2011) – journalist, in 2010 acting as the president  TVP S.A.
 Jerzy Machaj (1941–1997) – sports and local government activist, president of KS Polonia Warszawa
 Franciszek Maciak (1927–2002) – professor at the Warsaw University of Life Sciences
 Maciej E. Maciejewski (1932–2002) – sculptor
 Jan Maj (1936–2012) – sports activist, president of the Polish Football Association
 Longin Majdecki (1925–1997) – creator of the "History of Gardens"
 Elżbieta Malicka (1938–2009) – veterinarian, anatomopathologist, professor at the Faculty of Veterinary Medicine at the Warsaw University of Life Sciences; wife of Konrad Malicki
 Konrad Malicki (1929 – 2011) – veterinarian, virologist, professor at the Faculty of Veterinary Medicine at the Warsaw University of Life Sciences; husband of Elżbieta Malicka
 Jan Malinowski (1922–1994) – geologist
 Florian Maniecki (1927–2008) – agricultural economist, professor at the Warsaw University of Life Sciences
 Ryszard Manteuffel (1903–1991) – agricultural economist, professor at the Warsaw University of Life Sciences, member of the Polish Academy of Sciences
 Władysław Martyka (1915–1944) – insurgent of the Warsaw Uprising, in which he died
 Tadeusz Miciak (1915–2000) – activist of the Peasant movement and member of the Bataliony Chłopskie or Peasants' Battalions
 Antoni Mikołajczyk (1939–2000) – professor, visual artist
 Kazimierz Modzelewski (1934–2011) – artisan, entrepreneur, politician, Member of Parliament
 1998–2018: Janusz Nasfeter (1920–1998) – film director and screenwriter; in 2018 his remains were moved to the Powązki Cemetery in 2018
 Mieczysław Nasiłowski (1929–2004) – economist, professor  SGH
 Wojciech Natanson (1904–1996) – writer, translator
 Jerzy Ostromęcki (1909–1988) – meliorant, professor at the Warsaw University of Life Sciences
 Tadeusz Pajda (1927–1997) – journalist
 Zygmunt Pancewicz (1923–2008) – prof. Of the Warsaw University of Technology
 Jan Pęczek (1950–2021) – actor
 Henryk Pecherski (1908–1986) – pedagogue, prof. UW
 Andrzej Piszczatowski (1945–2011) – actor
 Teresa Plata–Nowińska (1946–2009) – professor at the Academy of Fine Arts in Warsaw
 Leopold Podbielski (1815–1875) – for 24 years vicar, and afterwards parson of the St. Catherine Parish
 Józefat Poznański (1834–1924) – pomologist, veteran January Uprising
 Regina Poźniak (1930–1985) – meliorant, professor at the Warsaw University of Life Sciences
 Henryk Pruchniewicz (1926–2006) – economist, former minister of the chemical industry
 Jan Przeździecki (1889–1951) – participant in the Polish–Bolshevik war, Home Army officer
 Zdzisław Przeździecki (1924–2012) – veterinarian, professor at the Warsaw University of Life Sciences, a soldier of the Home Army
 Wojciech Puzio (1928–1968) – athlete
 Janusz Rapnicki (1926–1969) – visual artist
 Edward Romanowski (1944–2007) – athlete
 Witold Rosa (1929–1985) – forester, docent at the Warsaw University of Life Sciences
 Kazimierz Siarkiewicz (1927–2001) – lawyer, professor
 Anna Skarbek–Sokołowska (1878–1972) – a writer
 Piotr Sobczyk (1887–1979) – an engineer–farmer, member of the Sejm of the 3rd, 4th and 5th term in the 2nd Polish Republic
 Jan Stępień (1895–1976) – painter
 Zdzisław Stępniak (1929–2005) – journalist
 Piotr Strebeyko (1908–2003) – biologist, professor of the University of Warsaw
 Abdon Stryszak (1908–1995) – veterinarian, professor of the University of Warsaw and the Warsaw University of Life Sciences
 Andrzej Szuster (1931–2008) – doctor of technical sciences, lecturer at the Warsaw University of Technology
 Piotr Szweda (1933–2008) – general
 Janina Szweycer–Grupińska (1914–1994) – social activist, initiator of the creation of the Polish branch of the Prison Brotherhood providing evangelical help to prisoners
  Jerzy Świątkiewicz (1925–2011) – lawyer, vice-chairman Supreme Administrative Court of Poland in 1998–95, deputy Ombudsman in 1995–2006 
 Teodor Tazbir (1921–1987) – philosopher
 Jan Ferdynand Tkaczyk (1925–2008) – music teacher, conductor
 Andrzej Tomaszewski (1934–2010) – professor of the Warsaw University of Technology, architect, town planner, architectural historian, medievalist, specialist in the field of  monument protection
 Ludwik Watycha (1909–1976) – habilitated doctor geologist, Tatra Mountains and Podhale region researcher
 Jerzy Wielbut (1936–1990) – artist, musician, violin maker
 Jerzy Więckowski (1921–1988) – professor, dean of the Faculty of Management of the University of Warsaw
 Bolesław Winiarski (1924–2000) – professor at the Warsaw University of Life Sciences
 Zbigniew Wnuk (1948–2009) – architect, Ph.D., researcher at the Warsaw University of Technology
 Andrzej Wyspiański (1955–1997) – painter, professor at the European Academy of Arts; possibly related to Polish painter, playwright and poet Stanisław Wyspiański
 Bolesław Zagała (1912–1995) – translator, author of stories for children and adolescents, editor–in–chief of Świerszczyk; decorated with the Order of the Smile; he was the husband of Janina Zagałowa
 Janina Zagała (1913–2001) – art historian, guide; she was he wife of Bolesław Zagała
 Edmund Zieliński (1909–1992) – hockey player, Olympian from  Garmisch–Partenkirchen.
 Sylwester Zieliński (1963–2000) – cinematographer
 Mikołaj Zozula (1915–1985) – journalist and peasant activist

References

External links
 

Ursynów
Cemeteries in Warsaw
Roman Catholic cemeteries in Poland